Gomphocarpus fruticosus is a species of plant native to South Africa. It is also common in New Zealand where it is the main host of the monarch butterfly. The plant's tissues contain sufficient cardenolides that consumption of significant quantities of the plant's leaves, stems, or fruit may lead to death in livestock and humans.

The plant, also referred to as Narrow leaf cotton bush, has officially been declared a pest in Western Australia.

The species is closely related to Gomphocarpus physocarpus.

References

External links
 

fruticosus
Plants described in 1753
Taxa named by Carl Linnaeus
Butterfly food plants
Flora of Southern Africa
Invasive plant species in Australia